National Highway 720, commonly referred to as NH 720, is a national highway in India. It is a secondary route of National Highway 20.  NH-720 runs in the state of Odisha in India.

Route 
NH720 connects Keonjhar, Basantpur, Deobandha, Bhagamunda, Brahmanipal, Dhanurjoypur and Duburi Chak in the state of Odisha.

Junctions  
 
  Terminal near Keonjhar.
  Terminal near Duburi Chak.

See also 
 List of National Highways in India
 List of National Highways in India by state

References

External links 

 NH 720 on OpenStreetMap

National highways in India
National Highways in Odisha